Westmill may be one of the following places in England:

 Westmill, East Hertfordshire
 Westmill (Hitchin), Hertfordshire
 Westmill Solar Park, Oxfordshire
 Westmill Wind Farm, Oxfordshire
 Westmill Woodland Burial Ground, Oxfordshire